Ergothioneine is a naturally occurring amino acid and is a thiourea derivative of histidine, containing a sulfur atom on the imidazole ring. This compound occurs in relatively few organisms, notably actinomycetota, cyanobacteria, and certain fungi. Ergothioneine was discovered in 1909 and named after the ergot fungus from which it was first purified, with its structure being determined in 1911.

In humans, ergothioneine is acquired exclusively through the diet and accumulates in erythrocytes, bone marrow, liver, kidney, seminal fluid, and eyes. Although the effect of ergothioneine in vivo is under preliminary research, its physiological role in humans is unknown. Ergothioneine is sold as a dietary supplement.

Metabolism and sources 
Ergothioneine has been found in bacteria, plants, and animals, sometimes at millimolar levels. Foods found to contain ergothioneine include liver, kidney, black beans, kidney bean, and oat bran, with the highest levels in bolete and oyster mushrooms. Levels can be variable, even within species and some tissues can contain much more than others. In the human body, the largest amounts of ergothioneine are found in erythrocytes, eye lens, semen, and skin.

Although many species contain ergothioneine, only a few make it; the others absorb it from their diet or, in the case of plants, from their environment. Biosynthesis has been detected in Actinomycetota, such as Mycobacterium smegmatis and certain fungi, such as Neurospora crassa.

The metabolic pathway to produce ergothioneine starts with the methylation of histidine to produce histidine betaine (hercynine). The sulfur atom is then incorporated from cysteine. The biosynthetic genes of ergothioneine have been described in Mycobacterium smegmatis, Neurospora crassa, and Schizosaccharomyces pombe.

Other species of bacteria, such as Bacillus subtilis, Escherichia coli, Proteus vulgaris, and Streptococcus, as well as fungi in the Saccharomycotina cannot make ergothioneine.

Structure 
Ergothioneine is a thiourea derivative of the betaine of histidine and contains a sulfur atom bonded to the 2-position of the imidazole ring.  Typical of thioureas, ergothioneine is less reactive than typical thiols such as glutathione towards alkylating agents like maleimides.  It also resists oxidation by air. However, ergothioneine can be slowly oxidized over several days to the disulfide form in acidic solutions.

Ergothioneine derivatives

Various derivatives of ergothioneine have been reported in the literature, such as S-methyl-ergothioneine or selenium-containing selenoneine.

Preliminary research

Although potential effects of ergothioneine are under preliminary research, its physiological role in vivo has not been determined.

Safe intake levels
The Panel on Dietetic Products for the European Food Safety Authority reported safe daily limits of 2.82 mg/kg of body weight for infants, 3.39 mg/kg for small children, and 1.31 mg/kg for adults, including pregnant and breastfeeding women.

See also 
Oxidative stress
Reactive oxygen species

References

External links 
Ergothioneine Human Metabolome Database
Ergothioneine KEGG Compound

Thioureas
Amino acids
Imidazolines